Cartagena railway station is the main railway station in the Spanish city of Cartagena in the Region of Murcia. It is the terminus of the Chinchilla–Cartagena railway, and the current station building opened in 1903.

Services
Cartagena is served by Media Distancia trains to Valencia-Nord and Altaria services to Madrid, all via Murcia del Carmen.

In 2018, the Alvia 730 service began, enabling travel times between Cartagena to Madrid of three hours and thirty-two minutes.

Future
Work began in 2018 to prepare Cartagena station as the future terminus of the Madrid–Levante high-speed rail network, due to reach the station in 2023.

References

Railway stations in the Region of Murcia